Flåm is a village in the Flåmsdalen valley which is located at the inner end of the Aurlandsfjorden, a branch of Sognefjorden. The village is located in Aurland Municipality in Vestland county, Norway. In 2014 its inhabitants numbered 350.

Name 
The name Flåm is documented as early as 1340 as Flaam. It is derived from the plural dative form of the Old Norse word flá meaning "plain, flat piece of land", and it refers to the flood plains of the Flåm River. ("A plain between steep mountains" is the toponomy of the encyclopedia Store Norske Leksikon.)

History 
In 1670 Flåm Church was built, replacing an older stave church.

In 1923, the construction of the Flåm Line railway was financed by the Norwegian Parliament. (In 1908, the decision to build the line was made.) In 1942, regular operation of (steam-powered) trains started on the Flåm Line.

"In the 1960s, cruise ships stayed on the fjord" [without reaching the port], according to Dagens Næringsliv.

In 2000, the "new pier" was referred to in a government document. ("The pier was built at the entrance to the new millennium", according to Dagens Næringsliv.)

Transportation 

The European route E16 highway between Oslo and Bergen runs through Flåm.

The navvy road, Rallarvegen stretches from Myrdal down to Flåm. (Pedestrians and bicyclists still use it.) At Myrdal it connects with the navvy road for the previously built Bergen Line.

Flåm is also connected by rail through the Flåm Line, a branch line of the Bergen Line.

Tourism 
The village of Flåm has since the late 19th century been a tourist destination.  It currently receives almost 450,000 visitors a year.  Most ride the  Flåm Line between Flåm and Myrdal, one of the steepest railway tracks at 1 in 18 (not counting rack railways) in the world.  There are also a few spirals.  A former rail station building in Flåm now houses a museum dedicated to the Flåm railway.

The harbour of Flåm receives some 160 cruise ships per year.

Complaints about and suggested curbs on tourism 
Air pollution in Flåm and Geiranger during the cruise season is similar to that of a big city. Cruise traffic in Norway emits more NOx than all road traffic in Norway combined. In a 2005 Bergens Tidende article, Kjetil Smørås (a hotel director and chairman of Fjord Norge said that "The cruise traffic pollutes more than several ten thousands of cars, and many of the worst ships sail up here (...) cruise tourists trod down the pristine Norwegian nature, and destroy the foundation for Vestlandet's four entries on Unesco's World Heritage lists".

In 2009, Jens Riisnæs (an author and NRK journalist) said "We have the world's most beautiful nation, we don't need to follow the cruise operators' premises. They can go other places with their polluting ships. It is unwanted noise."

In 2009, Dagens Næringsliv said that a report by Vestlandsforskning says that both "Flåm and Geiranger are nearing a limit in capacity. It might be an alternative and rather stand forth as a «relaxed», exclusive and somewhat less of a mass tourism, cruise destination."

In a 2014 Dagens Næringsliv article, a farmer said that "Previously the smell of summer was that of grass that had been cut. Now the smell is of heavy oil". Furthermore, "They [a retired couple] talk about fish that has disappeared from the fjord. In Norway, cruise ships are permitted to dump overboard their greywater in the postcard-narrow fjord-arms. Furthermore, the news article says that defecation in public by tourists, is already a problem; the village's train station has the only public toilets, and 200,000 tourists are expected in the summer season.

In 2014, tourism professor Arvid Viken said that "it is about time this [type of] tourism is evaluated somewhat more soberly than how it has been done in many municipalities for some years". Furthermore, this tourism "has low profit per tourist, but is often associated with considerable costs for" the municipal administrations.

People 
Flåm was the birthplace of the poet Per Sivle.

In media 
Part of the book "The Ship of the Dead" is set in Flåm.

Media gallery

References

External links 

Flåm webcam 
Visit Flåm

Villages in Vestland
Aurland
Tourist attractions in Vestland